Calophyllum is a genus of tropical flowering plants in the family Calophyllaceae. They are mainly distributed in Asia, with some species in Africa, the Americas, Australasia, and the Pacific Islands.

History
Members of the genus Calophyllum native to Malesia and Wallacea are of particular importance to traditional shipbuilding of the larger Austronesian outrigger ships and were carried with them in the Austronesian expansion as they migrated to Oceania and Madagascar. They were comparable in importance to how oaks were in European shipbuilding and timber industries. The most notable species is the mastwood (Calophyllum inophyllum) which grows readily in the sandy and rocky beaches of the island environments that the Austronesians colonized.

Description
Calophyllum are trees or shrubs. They produce a colorless, white, or yellow latex. The oppositely arranged leaves have leathery blades often borne on petioles. The leaves are distinctive, with narrow parallel veins alternating with resin canals. The inflorescence is a cyme or a thyrse of flowers that grows from the leaf axils or at the ends of branches. In the flower the sepals and petals may look similar and are arranged in whorls. There are many stamens. The fruit is a drupe with thin layers of flesh over a large seed.

Uses
Many species are used for their wood. Some are hardwood trees that can reach 30 meters in height. They tend to grow rapidly. The outer sapwood is yellowish, yellow-brown, or orange, sometimes with a pink tinge, and the inner heartwood is light reddish to red-brown. The wood has a streaked, ribboned, or zig-zag grain. The wood has been used to build boats, flooring, and furniture, and made into plywood. Calophyllum wood may be sold under the name bitangor, and the species may be used interchangeably; one shipment may contain boards from several different species.

Plants of the genus are also known for their chemistry, with a variety of secondary metabolites isolated, such as coumarins, xanthones, flavonoids, and triterpenes. Compounds from the genus have been reported to have cytotoxic, anti-HIV, antisecretory, cytoprotective, antinociceptive, molluscicidal, and antimicrobial properties. Some plants are used in folk medicine to treat conditions such as peptic ulcers, tumors, infections, pain, and inflammation.

C. inophyllum is the source of tamanu oil, a greenish, nutty-scented oil of commercial value. It has been used as massage oil, topical medicine, lamp oil, and waterproofing, and is still used in cosmetics. Tacamahac is the resin of the tree. This species is also cultivated for its wood and planted in coastal landscaping as a windbreak and for erosion control.

Symbolism
A stylized Calophyllum is featured on the national coat of arms of Nauru.

Diversity
There are approximately 187 species in the genus.

Species include:

Gallery

See also
Domesticated plants and animals of Austronesia

References

Bibliography

 
Malpighiales genera
National symbols of Nauru